Wenjing Lou, a professor at the Virginia Polytechnic Institute and State University, Falls Church, Virginia campus since 2011, was named Fellow of the Institute of Electrical and Electronics Engineers (IEEE) in 2015 for contributions to information and network security.

Prior to Virginia Tech, she was a faculty member in the Department of Electrical and Computer Engineering at Worcester Polytechnic Institute (WPI) from 2003 to 2011. She received a Ph.D. in Electrical and Computer Engineering from University of Florida, an M.A.Sc. in Computer Communications from Nanyang Technological University in Singapore, and an M.S. and a B.S. in Computer Science and Engineering from Xi'an Jiaotong University in China.

References 

Fellow Members of the IEEE
Living people
Virginia Tech faculty
Worcester Polytechnic Institute faculty
University of Florida alumni
Year of birth missing (living people)
American women engineers
American women academics
21st-century American women
American electrical engineers